In electrical safety testing, portable appliance testing (PAT, PAT inspection or PAT testing) is a process in the United Kingdom, Ireland, New Zealand and Australia by which electrical appliances are routinely checked for safety. The formal term for the process is "in-service inspection & testing of electrical equipment". Testing involves a visual inspection of the equipment and any flexible cables for good condition, and also where required, verification of earthing (grounding) continuity, and a test of the soundness of insulation between the current carrying parts, and any exposed metal that may be touched. The formal limits for pass/fail of these electrical tests vary somewhat depending on the category of equipment being tested.

Other countries have similar procedures, for example, testing of equipment according to DGUV Vorschrift 3 in Germany.

Purpose
Health and safety regulations require that electrical appliances are safe and maintained to prevent harm to workers. Many equipment manufacturers recommend testing at regular intervals to ensure continual safety; the interval between tests depending on both the type of appliance and the environment in which it is to be used. The European Low Voltage Directive governs the manufacture or importation of electrical appliances. Compliance to this has to be declared and indicated by the display of the CE mark on the product. The responsibility for this lies with the manufacturer or the importer and is policed by Trading Standards.

Testing equipment has been specifically developed for PAT inspections, based on the testing equipment used by manufacturers to ensure compliance with the British Standard Code of Practice and European product standards relevant to that type of appliance. This in turn allows testing and the interpretation of results to be de-skilled to a large extent.  The inspection of the appliances can largely be carried out in-house in many organisations. This can result in cost savings and more flexibility as to exactly when a PAT is carried out.

Origin of name
Portable appliance testing is abbreviated as PAT. The correct term for the whole process is "In-service Inspection & Testing of Electrical Equipment" (as defined by IET/IEE and City and Guilds).

In Australia and New Zealand, the common name for PAT is simply 'Test and Tag'. The regulatory guidelines are set out in AS/NZS3760:2010.

UK legal obligations

Appliances
British law (the Electricity at Work Regulations 1989) requires that all electrical systems (including electrical appliances) are maintained (so far it is reasonably and practicable) to prevent danger. Private houses are not covered by this legislation, although occupiers' liability requires householders not to deliberately expose occupants or visitors to unreasonable risks. The HSE and the local authority are responsible for the policing of this legislation.

Fixed wiring in buildings
Guidance from the Institution of Engineering and Technology (IET, published under the IEE brand) and the Health and Safety Executive (HSE) recommends that a competent person must inspect the installation regularly in any public building or a place that people work. They suggest initial intervals for combined inspection and testing that range from three months (for construction equipment) to one year, and in many cases, longer periods for re-testing (certain types of appliance in schools, hotels, offices and shops).

Although the Electricity at Work Regulations 1989 is an obligation on UK businesses, there is no obligation to undertake PAT inspection.  In reality neither act nor their corresponding regulations and associated statutory instruments detail PAT inspection as an obligation, but rather impose a requirement of maintenance of safety and evidence of routine maintenance for all hand-held, portable and plug-in equipment.

Today a great many private companies and other organizations do meet their legal obligations to protect their workers by an enforced PAT regime, but it is not the only route.

Recent HSE publications have relaxed their tone somewhat to acknowledge this, and now point out that in many situations annual PAT is disproportionate to the risks and is often not required. In 2011, the HSE reviewed its approach to portable appliance maintenance in its own offices. Thinking about the type of equipment in use, and how it was used, the HSE looked back at the results from its annual testing of portable appliances across its estate over the last five years. Using the results of the previous tests, the HSE decided that further portable appliance tests are not needed within the foreseeable future or at all for certain types of portable equipment. Also, they decided to continue to monitor any faults reported as a result of user checks and visual inspections and review its maintenance system if evidence suggests that it needs revising. Electrical equipment will continue to be maintained by a series of user checks and visual inspections by staff that have had some training.

Annual portable appliance testing is not always necessary in low risk environments.
You do not need to be qualified as an electrician to carry out visual inspections.
Regular user checks and visual inspections can be a good method of maintaining portable electric equipment.
For landlords maintaining legal requirements it is not compulsory for them to have all appliances tested, but they do need to show a "duty of care" and most letting agents recommend that a test certificate is obtained.

Origins in UK 

The earliest formal portable appliance testing and inspection of both electrical installations and high risk equipment was introduced in the UK in government estates.  This was under the control of the Property Services Agency – prior to 1972 the Ministry of Public Building and Works. In some cases testing was conducted on a three-month (high-risk) and six-month (low-risk) cycle from the early 1960s onwards. Extensive record-keeping was made into log-books and generally the equipment used was an insulation resistance tester, simple hand tools and visual inspection. Evidence of testing was clearly visible to workers in the form of "passed", "tested for electrical safety" and "do not use after..." labels affixed to various parts of the electrical equipment used. This early testing and inspection was done under a planned maintenance scheme and pre-dated both the Health and Safety at Work Act 1974 and the Electricity at Work Act 1989.

Site and campus requirements, events and contractors

In the UK there is no legal instrument that requires a sub-contractor to ensure that all tools and equipment are PAT inspected before bringing onto a site of work.  Neither is there any legal instrument which obliges the site owner to ensure third-party equipment is PAT inspected either by themselves or the equipment owner.

The internal policies of many UK businesses and educational establishments make mistaken reference to PAT inspection being a legal requirement under the Electricity at Work Regulations, which is false.  Having such a policy is legitimate for internal reasons, but it is not underwritten by law, it is only their interpretation.  Therefore, it is not a legal requirement to have a PAT inspection sticker or certificate, the obligation is that equipment must be safe.

The HSE recommend policies use phrases such as "Equipment that is brought onto site for an event must be in a safe condition" and refrain from overzealous statements such as "must be PAT inspected" which can be restrictive without improving safety.  Overall it is safer if a competent person makes a visual inspection than if a layman merely observes the presence of a sticker.

Carrying out PAT 

This can be done by hiring an external company to test all the electrical products in a business (someone who has had some PAT training, either by an official qualification or by attending a health and safety course offered by some electrical health and safety companies) or it can be done in-house by a competent person.  In a low-risk environment most dangerous defects can be found simply by checking the appliances for obvious signs of damage such as frayed cables.

User checks
Advising the user of potential danger signs can result in problems being picked up before they can result in any danger. For example, if the power cable is frayed or the plug is cracked, users need to be advised not to use the appliance and report the fault to a supervisor. This information can be put across, say by the use of a poster or in a memo. User checks are always carried out before the operation, and the results are generally not recorded unless a defect is identified.

Formal visual inspections
This is a process of simply inspecting the appliance, the cable and the plug for any obvious signs of damage. According to the HSE, this process can find more than 90% of faults.

Combined inspections and PAT 
At periodic intervals, the portable appliances are tested to measure that the degree of protection to ensure that it is adequate. At these intervals, a formal visual inspection is carried out and then followed by electrical testing. Note the inside of the plug should be checked unless it is moulded or there is an unbroken seal covering the screws (bad internal wiring or an unsuitable fuse would cause the item to be classed as dangerous).

Testing

The tests an appliance is required to undergo will depend on the type of appliance, its electrical Class and subject to a risk assessment by the technician. e.g. it may not be safe to perform a leakage current test which powers up the appliance, such as a grinder, if it can not be secured to a bench; an insulation resistance test may be a safe option.

Earth resistance test
This test shows the resistance offered by the earthing rods with the connection leads. Various testing instruments are available for earthing resistance tests. The earthing resistance should be less than 1Ω.

Earth continuity test
The equipment shall have a measured resistance of the protective earth circuit, or the earthing conductor of an extension cord or appliance cord set, which does not exceed 1Ω.

Testing is performed using an ohmmeter or PAT tester;
 Using the ohmmeter to produce a reading;
 Using a PAT tester under the following conditions;
 12V maximum, test current range 100mA to 200mA - commonly known as "earth continuity test" or "screen test" 
 12V maximum, test current 10A - commonly known as "routine test" 
 12V maximum, 1.5 times rated current of appliance or 25A, whichever is greater - commonly known as "type test" or "bond test".

The choice of which of the tests to use is at the operator's discretion as there is merit in each test for given situations.  Later model testers that are battery powered are limited to doing the "screen test". Older mains powered units can do all tests. The purpose of the high current test is to simulate a fault condition: if a live part contacts the earthed metalwork, the earth conductor should be able to carry sufficient current to blow the fuse and render the appliance safe, without the earth conductor itself burning out. On the other hand, some equipment (especially IT equipment) could be damaged by this test, as the earth connection is only for functional purposes and is not meant to be relied upon for safety.

Insulation resistance test
A leakage current test performed at rated voltage with values not exceeding 5mA for Class I appliances or 1mA for Class II appliances.

Alternatively, measured insulation resistance (IR) values are not less than 1MΩ for Class I and Class II appliances at 500 V d.c., or at 250 V d.c. to avoid the equipment apparently failing the test because the metal oxide varistors (MOVs) or electro-magnetic interference (EMI) suppression triggered, for equipment containing voltage limiting devices such as MOVs or EMI suppression.

Leakage current testing is performed using a PAT by applying a nominal voltage to the live conductors (active and neutral) of an appliance, and placing 0 volt reference on the earthed parts of a Class I appliance or the external metal parts of a Class II appliance;
 Nominal voltage is 230 V AC. (therefore it can not be performed with a digital multimeter)

Insulation resistance testing is performed using an ohmmeter or portable appliance tester by applying a nominal voltage to the live conductors (active and neutral) of an appliance, and placing 0 volt reference on the earthed parts of a Class I appliance or the external metal parts of a Class II appliance;
 Nominal voltage is 500 V DC (250 V DC may be used for equipment containing MOVs / EMI filtering)

A deficiency of the insulation resistance (500 V /250 V DC) test is that the DC voltage will not activate electromagnetic switches or internal relays etc. that are common in many modern power tools, computers, TVs etc. and therefore it can only test the appliance up to that point. Appliances with these components / design should be tested using the leakage current test.

Leakage test 
AS/NZS 3760:2010 section 2.3.3.2 requires a leakage test to be carried out if equipment being tested must be energised to close the circuit or operate a switching device. Leakage testing does require the item being tested to be powered up thus meaning the item will switch on and operate.

Polarity check
In countries where the sockets are polarised, polarity testing is a simple test that can be carried out using a polarity tester to determine whether the active and neutral of the plug end are correctly connected to the corresponding terminals at the socket end. Note: The earth is tested during the earth continuity test. In the UK, as per BS 7671, the phase ('Live' or 'Hot') cable should connect with right hand side terminal of the socket (if we face the socket outlet).

Plugs
The order (polarity) of the pins of a three pin flat pin plug, to their connections, shall be Earth (radial pin – green/yellow wire), Neutral (light blue wire) and then Active (brown wire), in a clockwise direction, when viewed from the front of the plug looking at the pins.

Cord extension sockets
The order (polarity) of the socket apertures of a three pin flat pin socket, to their connections, shall be Earth (radial pin – green/yellow wire), Active (brown wire) and then Neutral (light blue wire), in a clockwise direction, when viewed from the front of the socket looking at the apertures.

RCDs / ELCBs / safety switches
For residual-current devices (RCDs), a type of earth-leakage circuit breaker (ELCB), there are two test methods to be used:

Press button
This test requires specific test equipment RCD tester:

(the TEST button referred to here is the test button on the RCD tester not the TEST button on the RCD itself. If the RCD is live, pressing the RCD's own test button should always trip the RCD).

The RCD tester should be connected with the socket, with earth terminal and 
select the testing range 'delta' (10 mA, 30 mA, 100 mA, 300 mA, 500 mA).
Select half delta range, and press TEST button - the RCD should not operate, this ensures against nuisance tripping.
Select delta range, and press TEST button - The RCD should operate, within ms for 50 Hz, 230 V system (as per BS 7671)

Applied current
This test requires specialised test equipment, knowledge and training;
A current, equal to the rated tripping current, shall be "suddenly" applied between active and protective earth and the operating time measured with maximum trip time 40 ms for Type I and 300 ms for Type II.

In addition to this, many technicians also test;
using 1/2 (half) the rated tripping current to detect nuisance tripping.
using 5 times rated tripping current, with trip times reduced accordingly, to simulate high current exposure.
under 0 degree and 180 degree phases

Best Practice is to test the RCD under 1/2, 1X and 5X rated tripping current, each at both the 0 degree and 180 degree phases.

Microwave ovens
Specific microwave leakage testing was recommended for microwave ovens in the United Kingdom up until version 3 of the IET Code of Practice.

The first is that the device immediately ceases production of the microwave radiation when the door is opened, which checks that the safety interlock systems are functional; and the second is that any leakage when operating is less than 5 mWcm−2 which indicates that the door and casing are not distorted and any seals are intact so that there is no hazard to those in the vicinity of the equipment.

A piece of calibrated equipment is required for these tests to detect and measure leakage of the 2.4 GHz microwave radiation, it is usually a hand-held device with a sensing antenna that can be scanned over the areas where the door meets the casing to find any radiation hot-spots whilst the unit is operating. As microwave ovens are not normally designed to be operated without a load this will usually take the form of an open container containing a quantity of water which is used to absorb the energy and as it gets warmed gives an indication that a unit not previously examined by a tester is actually producing microwaves.  After checking for leakage the door is required to be opened by whatever means is provided and the measurement device is not to record a level above the given limit. In some scenarios a known quantity of water is heated for a known period of time and the temperature rise over the period of operation is used to generate an indication of the effective power output of the magnetron. This can be helpful to determine whether the oven is operating at the expected power levels indicated by labelling.

Microwave leakage testing was removed in version 4 of the IET Code of Practice, to revert microwave oven testing to the same as any other appliance, but with emphasis put on the visual inspection of the door seal.

Class of construction 
Electrical appliance classesare differentiated by a series of IEC protection classes. The protocols for PAT Testing vary by appliance class:

Class I – Single insulated wiring, which requires an earth connection for safety. If the appliance has no symbol on it, then it is to be treated as Class I for the purpose of testing.
Class II – Double insulated wiring, The earth clamp is still connected during the insulation test. The appliance may or may not have an earth connection (some appliances have a functional earth), but the safety of the appliance does not depend on the earth connection. Class II is indicated by double box.
Class III – These are appliances that are supplied at a low voltage called Separated Extra Low Voltage (SELV) which must be less than 50 V. These appliances are supplied with a transformer supply that is also marked as an SELV PSU.
Classes such as Class 0 are not legal in the UK and other countries. By treating all appliances without Class II or III markings as Class I by default, Class 0 appliances will fail testing as a Class I device. Similarly, Class II or III with stickers that have fallen off will also fail.

The earth lead is connected to metal parts on both Class I and Class II appliances. For "Class I" during the earth test to prove continuity between earth pin and metal parts on the appliance. For "Class II" during the insulation test to prove the insulation between active-neutral and the metal parts of the appliance. i.e. there is no leakage from mains coming into the appliance to the metal parts that are exposed.

PAT training and qualifications
 
In the UK, there is no requirement to have a formal qualification for persons carrying out PAT Testing.  The Electricity at Work regulations of 1989 simply state that where required, inspecting and testing must be carried out by a competent person, however does not mention a benchmark for competency.  It has become accepted practice, however, for individuals operating as PAT Testers to hold a 2377–22 City and Guilds qualification.  PAT Testers in the UK do not need to be electricians or have a background in the electrical industry. An example of a nationally recognised qualification of competence in PAT is offered by City & Guilds: 'Code of Practice for In-service Inspection and Testing of Electrical Equipment – 4th Edition (No. 2377)'. although there are others provided by EAL available.

In Australia it is not a legal requirement to have attended a course or gained a qualification in order to PAT - AS/NZS 3760 2010 stipulates a Competent Person may Test and Tag, and that a person may be a Competent Person through formal training (i.e. a test and tag course), experience on the job, qualification, or combination thereof.

In New Zealand it is not a legal requirement to attend a training course however persons undertaking Portable Appliance Testing must be deemed Competent by a Responsible person (being the owner of the premises electrical equipment or someone with a legal responsibility for the safety of electrical equipment).

Types of PAT testers
PAT testing can be conducted manually, using a collection of standard test gear, including a high-voltage insulation tester and a low resistance ohm meter for earth continuity. But generally it is conducted with an automatic tester that applies a sequence of tests in turn.

At the basic level, PAT test instruments carry out basic safety checks. Most are equipped with an earth continuity test, insulation resistance test and the ability to check the wiring of detachable mains cords. Many do not however include tests which involve applying mains power to the appliance under test, for example, a protective conductor current or touch current tests. The main kind for businesses are simple PASS/FAIL testers that are easy to use, and are aimed at in-house PAT testing with minimal interpretation of results. Advanced PAT testers can give much more information and testing features but are mainly aimed at more highly skilled users.

Pass / fail PAT testers
These are the simple-to-use and comparatively much cheaper portable appliance testers for most businesses who will test in-house to carry out the testing and suitable for a wide range of businesses. They simply say PASS or FAIL when a test is carried out. Mains powered testers require AC power. Battery operated PAT testers are self-contained and convenient to use. They usually come with rechargeable batteries.

These testers have a simple "lights" system. They have a "Pass" light, a "Fail" light, options for Class I metal / plastic or Class II. They also will show:
earth continuity 
insulation resistance 
polarity.

Advanced PAT testers
These testers display more information than just pass or fail, including:
Earth continuity resistance (aka Earth Bond) tests with a measurement range of 0 – 1.99 Ω at high test currents (usually 8 A, 10 A or 25 A) and lower test currents (in the range 20 mA to 200 mA), enabling a complete range of appliances including personal computers to be tested;
Insulation resistance tests at test voltages of 500 V DC or 250 V DC.
Protective conductor/touch current measurement (sometimes referred to as "earth leakage tests" on some older PAT units);
Fuse test;
Lead polarity.

These readings require interpretation by an electrician or someone with electrical understanding. Advanced PAT testers are effective as facilities management tools because they can record the location and test status of electrical equipment and appliances.

RCD testing
Some units can also test RCDs, following the recommendation in the current IEE Code of Practice to test any RCD fitted on an extension lead or multiway adapter.

Computerised PAT testers
Some advanced PAT testers can download information to a computer. Bluetooth enabled computerised PAT testers make the two way transfer of test data between the tester and PC-based record keeping systems much simpler, and can be used with other test accessories such as label printers. Records can be maintained using PAT software such as PATorganiser.

Calibration of testers 
As PAT testers are sophisticated instruments, it is important to make sure that they are continuing to measure correctly. If a company fails to check and maintain calibration, it could face difficulty substantiating any measurements in the event of a claim. It is usually recommended that calibration is carried out annually on a PAT testing unit.

When a PAT tester is calibrated, it is internally trimmed to match the original specification. This includes:

Ensuring the resistance readout is accurate and correcting for any drift arising from ageing of components inside the PAT tester,
Calibrating the unit back to national standards. This is best performed by the product manufacturer (if they offer a calibration service) or a laboratory accredited by United Kingdom Accreditation Service (UKAS)
If it is mains powered, then a safety test must be carried out.
A calibration certificate should be issued to prove the PAT unit has been electrically tested.

Dual purpose check boxes (which are essentially known resistances either side of the test limits) have also been introduced which are capable of validating the accuracy of both electrical installation testers and portable appliance testers in the field, reducing the risk of a tester being used when not operating correctly - this also allows the re-calibration interval to be increased.

References

External links
HSE guidance on PAT testing
HSE Portable appliance testing FAQs
HSE Maintaining electrical equipment safety
UK Health and Safety Executive – Portable appliance testing myths debunked
IET/IEE Code of practice for in-service inspection and testing of electrical equipment
Memorandum of guidance on the Electricity at Work Regulations 1989. Guidance on Regulations

Electrical safety in the United Kingdom
Electrical tests
Occupational safety and health
Product testing
Safety engineering